Nicolette Larson (July 17, 1952 – December 16, 1997) was an American singer. She is perhaps best known for her work in the late 1970s with Neil Young and her 1978 hit single of Young's "Lotta Love", which hit No. 1 on the Hot Adult Contemporary Tracks chart and No. 8 on the pop singles chart. It was followed by four more adult contemporary hits, two of which were also minor pop hits.

By 1985, she shifted her focus to country music, charting six times on the US country singles chart. Her only top-40 country hit was "That's How You Know When Love's Right", a duet with Steve Wariner. She died in 1997 of cerebral edema and liver failure.

Early life and career 
Nicolette Larson was born in Helena, Montana. Her father's employment with the U.S. Treasury Department necessitated frequent relocation for the family. She graduated from high school in Kansas City, Missouri, where she attended the University of Missouri for three semesters and worked at waitressing and office jobs before beginning to pursue the musical career she had dreamed of since singing along to the radio as a child.

Larson eventually settled in San Francisco, California, where she worked in a record store; her volunteer work as support staff for the Golden Gate Country Bluegrass Festival brought encouragement for her vocal ambitions. She began performing in Bay Area showcases, making her professional debut opening for Eric Andersen at a club in Vancouver, British Columbia. In 1975, Larson auditioned for Hoyt Axton, who was producing Commander Cody. This led to Larson's performing with Hoyt Axton and The Banana Band, who were opening for Joan Baez on the 1975 "Diamonds and Rust" tour. She gained her first recording credit on Commander Cody's 1975 album, Tales From the Ozone, and also provided background vocals for Commander Cody albums in 1977 and 1978. Other early career singing credits were for Hoyt Axton and Guy Clark in 1976 and in 1977 for Mary Kay Place, Rodney Crowell, Billy Joe Shaver, Jesse Colin Young, Jesse Winchester, and Gary Stewart.

Larson and Guthrie Thomas both worked with Hoyt Axton and recorded their first professional recording session together on Axton's Southbound album for A&M Records. As newcomers to the recording industry, they were listed on the back cover of the album as "Street Singers", entirely separate from the highly paid, well-respected artists who also appeared on the album.

Larson's work with Emmylou Harris – the album Luxury Liner (1977) prominently showcased Larson on the song "Hello Stranger" – led to her meeting Harris's associate and friend Linda Ronstadt, who became friends with Larson. In 1977, Larson was at Ronstadt's Malibu home when neighbor Neil Young phoned to ask Ronstadt if she could recommend a female vocal accompanist. Ronstadt suggested Larson; she was the third person that day to mention Larson to Young. Young came over to meet Larson, who recalled, "Neil ran down all the songs he had just written, about twenty of them. We sang harmonies with him and he was jazzed."

The following week Ronstadt and Larson cut their vocals for Young's American Stars 'n Bars album at Young's La Honda ranch – the two women were billed on the album as the Bullets – and, in November 1977, Young invited Larson to Nashville to sing on his Comes a Time album. This led to Larson's being signed to Warner Brothers, an affiliate of Young's home label Reprise.

Larson continued her background singing career into 1978, accruing credit on recordings by Marcia Ball, Rodney Crowell, Emmylou Harris (Quarter Moon in a Ten Cent Town), and Norton Buffalo. She also contributed vocals to the Doobie Brothers' Minute by Minute. That album's producer, Ted Templeman, then produced Larson's debut album, Nicolette.

1978–1983 
Larson's work with Commander Cody had led to her being signed to the C&W division of Warner Bros. Records. However her debut album Nicolette, released September 29, 1978, was an eclectic mix of rock, C&W and R&B.

Despite the release of her album so late in the year, Larson was acclaimed Female Vocalist of 1978 by Rolling Stone, which wrote no one else could sound as if she were having so much fun on an album. Nicolette reached No. 15 on Billboard's album chart aided by the hit single "Lotta Love", a Neil Young composition. Larson's "Lotta Love" hit #1 on the Easy Listening/Adult Contemporary chart and went Top 10 Pop in February 1979, the same week the single off Comes a Time, "Four Strong Winds" (an Ian & Sylvia record with Larson uncredited on the single), debuted on the Hot 100 on its way to a No. 61 peak. ("Sail Away", a track featuring Larson, from the Comes a Time sessions or shortly afterwards, was included on the otherwise live Neil Young album Rust Never Sleeps, released in 1979.)

Warner Brothers also issued the limited edition (5,000 copies) promo-only Live at the Roxy album comprising a December 20, 1978 concert given by Larson at the Sunset Boulevard nightclub. Larson was also featured on the No Nukes album recorded in September 1979 at Madison Square Garden, backed by the Doobie Brothers in her performance of "Lotta Love"; Larson can be seen in the No Nukes film but her performance was not included.

Larson would be unable to consolidate the commercial success augured by her debut: the second single off Nicolette, "Rhumba Girl" just missed becoming a major hit for Larson at No. 48. Her second album, In the Nick of Time, released November 1979, failed to showcase Larson's voice attractively. Don Shewey in Rolling Stone wrote:Larson's rough-edged, down-home tone is definitely appealing – especially when she backs up the likes of Neil Young and Steve Goodman [whose High and Outside album featured a duet with Larson: "The One That Got Away"] – but as a soloist, her limited vocal resources are "severely taxed" – "It's symptomatic of Nicolette Larson's problems as a performer that the finest singing on In the Nick of Time is by Michael McDonald. 'Let Me Go, Love'...McDonald's entrancing vocal presence...so overshadows Larson's that she seems to be playing second fiddle rather than sharing the lead. Elsewhere, Larson is dwarfed by Ted Templeman's typically luxurious production".

Released as the album's lead single, "Let Me Go Love" reached only No. 35 in February 1980. That year Larson was heard on the airwaves via guest appearances on "Say You'll Be Mine" by Christopher Cross and the Dirt Band's "Make a Little Magic". Larson had enough residual popularity from her debut for In the Nick of Time to become a moderate success. Because she had no major hit, Larson's 1981 and 1982 album releases, Radioland (her last album produced by Templeman) and All Dressed Up and No Place to Go, were unsuccessful, even though both releases showed Larson back in strong vocal form. Larson received some adult-contemporary radio airplay with her remake of "I Only Want to Be With You" (No. 53), perhaps the least effective track on All Dressed Up and No Place to Go. The album was produced by Andrew Gold.

Larson had continued her background singing career accruing credits on releases by Tom Johnston, Linda Ronstadt (Mad Love), Graham Nash, John Stewart, Albert Hammond, and Rita Coolidge. Larson again backed the Doobie Brothers on their One Step Closer album; she can be heard on the hit "Real Love." A song Larson co-wrote with John McFee and Patrick Simmons titled "Can't Let It Get Away" was a 1981 single release for the Doobie Brothers in Japan. The song was also featured on the Doobie Brothers' Farewell Tour album (1983).

Larson contributed a harmony vocal on the track "Could This Be Magic" on the Van Halen album Women and Children First (1980), to thank Eddie Van Halen for playing guitar on the Nicolette album track "Can't Get Away From You," against David Lee Roth's wishes.

Larson's recording of the Burt Bacharach/Carole Bayer Sager song "Fool Me Again" was featured on the bestselling soundtrack album for the 1981 film Arthur, despite not being heard in the film. Larson was also featured on the soundtrack album for National Lampoon's Vacation (1983) with the track "Summer Hearts".

1983–1997 
Larson's appearance in a touring production of the C&W musical Pump Boys and Dinettes garnered enough positive reaction for MCA Nashville to sign her in 1983. The Nashville music community was so enthused about Larson's C&W cross-over that in 1984 the Academy of Country Music named her the Best New Female Vocalist before she had any MCA Nashville releases. Larson's MCA debut ...Say When was not released until 1985 (by which point country pop was no longer in style and neotraditionalists had taken over the country scene). The C&W career it ushered in for Larson proved anticlimactic with only one of her six MCA single releases becoming a significant hit: her duet with Steve Wariner titled "That's How You Know When Love's Right," taken from the April 1986 album release Rose of My Heart. The record reached No. 9 C&W. Larson's MCA albums, produced by Emory Gordy Jr. and Tony Brown, attracted little critical attention. Her final mainstream album release was Shadows of Love, a 1988 recording made for the Italian CGD label and produced by Carlo Stretti and Ernesto Taberelli. It was her only album for a non-US label. In 1990 Larson participated in the Festival di Sanremo, duetting with Grazia Di Michele on the song "Me and My Father".

In 1992 Larson reunited professionally with Neil Young to sing on his Harvest Moon album. In 1993 she was featured on Young's Unplugged. She also provided vocal accompaniment on "The Little Drummer Boy" and "Greensleeves", two of the tracks Young contributed to Seven Gates: A Christmas Album by Ben Keith and Friends (1994). Larson's final album was the self-produced Sleep, Baby, Sleep, consisting of music for children, released on Sony Wonder in 1994.

Larson also contributed to the seasonal albums Tennessee Christmas  (1987) with "One Bright Star", Acoustic Christmas (1988) with "Christmas Is a Time for Giving," and Have Yourself a Merry Little Christmas (1989) with "Nothing But a Child" and "One Bright Star". In 1988, Larson contributed to the soundtracks of the films They Call Me Renegade and Twins with the tracks "Let Me Be the One" and "I'd Die for This Dance", respectively; the latter was performed live onscreen by Larson, accompanied by Jeff Beck.

While it was recorded in 1978, Live at the Roxy was given its first full release in 2006, nine years after Larson's death. It was released by Rhino. Also in 2006, Rhino Entertainment released the album A Tribute to Nicolette Larson: Lotta Love Concert. Two "Lotta Love" concerts were held on February 20 and 21, 1998, in Santa Monica, CA, to benefit the UCLA Children's Hospital.

Personal life 
Through her early work in the 1970s with Emmylou Harris, Larson met guitarist and songwriter Hank DeVito. Larson and DeVito later married and divorced. She also dated Neil Young during the Comes a Time sessions. In the early 1980s, Larson was engaged to Andrew Gold, but their relationship ended shortly after the completion of Larson's 1982 album All Dressed Up and No Place to Go, which Gold had produced. In the late 1980s, she briefly dated "Weird Al" Yankovic. In 1990, Larson married drummer Russ Kunkel, and the two remained married until her death in 1997. The couple's daughter, Elsie May Larson-Kunkel, was born in 1990.

Death 
Larson died on December 16, 1997, in Los Angeles, California, as a result of complications arising from cerebral edema triggered by liver failure. She was 45 years old. According to her friend Astrid Young, Neil Young's half-sister, Larson had been showing symptoms of depression, and her fatal seizure "was in no small way related to her chronic use of Valium and Tylenol PM." Larson was buried at Forest Lawn – Hollywood Hills Cemetery in Los Angeles, California. Two benefit concerts were held in Larson's honor in February 1998. Tribute concerts were held on the 10th anniversary of her death in December 2007 and also the following year.

Discography

Albums

Singles 

A Reached No. 96 on the Black Singles chart.

References

External links 
 
 
 
 

1952 births
1997 deaths
American people of Swedish descent
American country singer-songwriters
American women country singers
Deaths from cerebral edema
Deaths from liver failure
Neurological disease deaths in California
Singers from Montana
People from Helena, Montana
Burials at Forest Lawn Memorial Park (Hollywood Hills)
20th-century American singers
Warner Records artists
MCA Records artists
Songwriters from Montana
20th-century American women singers